Hemileccinum subglabripes is a fungus of the family Boletaceae native to North America. It was first described by Charles Horton Peck in 1887 as Boletus subglabripes. In 2015 it was transferred to Hemileccinum based on DNA evidence.

The species is edible but softens quickly.

See also
List of North American boletes

References

External links
 

Boletaceae
Edible fungi
Fungi described in 1887
Fungi of North America
Taxa named by Charles Horton Peck